Franciscus "Frank" Adrianus Ludewig (22 October 1863 – 16 September 1940) was a Dutch architect who lived and worked mostly in the United States. He is primarily known for his church architecture. Two of the buildings which he designed are on the National Register of Historic Places.

Life and career
Ludewig was born in Beverwijk, Netherlands and studied architecture at the Polytechnical Institute in Delft where he befriended another future architect, Jacobus van Gils (1869–1919), whose sister Dorothea he married in 1896. The couple had two children, James W. Ludewig and Frank M. Ludewig.

After graduation, Ludewig worked at the Amsterdam office of architect P.J.H. Cuypers, probably as a draftsman. In 1902 he began his own  office in Arnhem and moved two years later to Nijmegen. He built several houses, reconstructed Wijchen castle and restored churches in Beek, Leur and Rosmalen. In 1912 he migrated to the United States, hoping to find opportunities to design churches. He set up an architectural office in St. Louis, Missouri and later moved to Holland, Michigan.  In the nineteen years of his American career, Ludewig built 21 churches and chapels, 11 schools and 10 presbyteries. His most important work, and one of his last, was the Pontifical College Josephinum in Columbus, Ohio. Ludewig retired at the age of 69 and, after suffering from heart ailment for 18 months, died in Grand Rapids, Michigan in 1940. His grave is at the Pilgrim Home Cemetery, Holland, Michigan.

Selected works 

1902 Zutphen, Netherlands: presbytery
1902 Zutphen, Netherlands: gate-house for a Catholic cemetery
1905-1909 Beek, Netherlands: restoration of the Reformed church, construction of new apse and consistory
1906 Wijchen, Netherlands: restoration of the castle
1910-1911 Leur, Netherlands: restoration of the Reformed church
1911 Rosmalen, Netherlands: extension of the Catholic St. Lambert's church
1914 Westwoods, Illinois: Church of the Presentation of the Blessed Virgin Mary
1917-1918 Lindsay, Texas: St. Peter's Church
1922-1924 Covington, Kentucky: St. John the Evangelist church
1924 St. Louis, Missouri : St. Aloysius church
1926 St. Louis, Missouri: Holy Family church
1927-1928 Columbus, Ohio, St. Aloysius church
1927-1931 Columbus, Ohio : Pontifical College Josephinum
1930 Louisville, Kentucky: The Cumberland (apartment building)
Year unknown Raymond, Illinois: St. Raymond church
Year unknown Conway, Arkansas: St. Joseph church
1925 Muenster, Texas: Sacred Heart School

References 

1863 births
1940 deaths
19th-century Dutch architects
20th-century American architects
20th-century Dutch architects
Architects of Roman Catholic churches
Delft University of Technology alumni
Dutch emigrants to the United States
People from Beverwijk